Luis Child (died 17 December 1992) was a Colombian swimmer. He competed in two events at the 1948 Summer Olympics.

References

External links
 

Year of birth missing
1992 deaths
Colombian male swimmers
Olympic swimmers of Colombia
Swimmers at the 1948 Summer Olympics
Place of birth missing
20th-century Colombian people